USRC Vigilant may refer to various ships of the United States Revenue-Marine (1790–1894) and United States Revenue Cutter Service (1894–1915):

, the first cutter in the Revenue Marine, in service from 1791 to 1798
, a cutter in service from 1797 to 1812
, a schooner in commission from 1812 to 1842
, in service from 1843 until destroyed in a hurricane in 1844
, in service from 1856 to 1866
, a schooner placed in service in 1876
, in service in the Revenue Cutter Service from 1910 to 1915 and in the United States Coast Guard from 1915 to 1940

See also
 for ships of the United States Navy
 for ships of the United States Coast Guard (1915–present)

Notes
 Ships of the United States Revenue-Marine, United States Revenue Cutter Service, and United States Coast Guard were often placed under the authority of the United States Navy during times of war.

Ship names